Black Board Jungle, often called Blackboard Jungle Dub, is a studio album by The Upsetters. The album, originally released in 1973 under artist name "Upsetters 14 Dub", was pressed in only 300 copies and issued only in Jamaica.

According to Pauline Morrison, this was the first ever dub album that came out, although there is a lot of speculation on the subject. Nevertheless, this was the first stereo dub album, as well as the first to include reverb. Later pressings released as Blackboard Jungle Dub have a different track listing. The album was re-issued as a 3x 10" colored vinyl box set as part of Record Store Day in April, 2012.

Track listing

Side one
"Black Panta"
"V/S Panta Rock"
"Khasha Macka"
"Elephant Rock"
"African Skank"
"Dreamland Skank" – The Wailers
"Jungle Jim"

Side two
"Drum Rock"
"Dub Organizer" – Dillinger
"Lovers Skank"
"Mooving Skank" – The Wailers
"Apeman Skank"
"Jungle Fever"
"Kaya Skank" – The Wailers

Personnel
Drums – Lloyd "Tin Legs" Adams, Carly Barrett, Anthony "Benbow" Creary, Leroy "Horsemouth" Wallace
Bass – Family Man, Lloyd Parks, Errol "Bagga" Walker
Guitar – Alva Lewis, Valentine "Tony" Chin, Anthony "Sangie" Davis, Barrington Daley
Organ – Glen Adams, Winston Wright, Bernard "Touter" Harvey
Piano – Gladstone "Gladdy" Anderson, Tommy McCook
Melodica – Augustus Pablo
Trombone – Ronald Wilson
Trumpet – Bobby Ellis
Percussion – Noel "Skully" Simms, Uziah "Sticky" Thompson, Lee Perry
Engineers – Lee Perry, King Tubby

References

The Upsetters albums
1973 albums
Dub albums
Albums produced by Lee "Scratch" Perry